Saad Abdul-Amir Luaibi Al-Zirjawi  ( born 19 January 1992 in Iraq) is an Iraqi defensive midfielder who plays for Al-Zawraa and for the Iraq national football team which he earned his first cap in 2010 at the age of 18. Saad started his career in his hometown club Al-Karkh SC. In 2010, he transferred to Northern Iraqi side Erbil SC, spending 5 years at the club where he won the 2011–12 Iraqi Premier League. In 2015, he made his first move abroad, signing for Saudi side Al-Qadisiyah. He moved to Al-Shabab in 2017.

Club career

Early career 
Saad began playing for shaabiya teams in the Shuala district of Baghdad, then with the Al-Shuala club juniors and Al-Kadhimiya before joining Al-Karkh, guiding them to promotion back to the top flight in 2010.

Saad came into the international fold in 2010 after impressing for the Iraqi School team. In the summer of 2010, weeks after he had won the Arab School Championship in Beirut with the Iraqi School team beating Egypt 2–1 in the final, Saad was included in Wolfgang Sidka’s first squad and was one of only three players from the initial preliminary squad that was selected for the final 2010 WAFF Championship squad. The retirement of Qusay Munir and career threatening injury to Muthanna Khalid saw Saad become Iraq's most experienced player in midfield in the run-up to the 2015 AFC Asian Cup, four years after he had sat on the bench at the 2011 tournament in Doha watching Qusay and Nashat Akram organising the midfield. In Australia at the 2015 Asian Cup, Saad formed a strong midfield partnership with Swindon Town's Yaser Kasim that was one of the reasons for Iraq reaching the semi-finals.

Al-Karkh 
Saad was handed his debut aged just 16 in 2008, he played for 3 seasons in the Iraqi Second division where his defensive prowess and short passing ability earned him a transfer to Kurdish side Erbil. Saad Played 40 times for Al Karkh by the time he was 18.

Erbil 
Saad Joined Erbil in 2010, it is there where his performances earned him his first call up to the national side. Saad remained at the club for 5 years, winning the league title once and finishing runner up in the AFC Cup Twice. He moved to Al Qadisiyah in 2015.

Al-Qadisiyah  
2015/2016
Saad Moved to Al-Qadisiyah in summer 2015 on a one-year contract and was handed the number 25 Shirt. Saad started often in the defensive midfield position or the Right midfield Position, he also played at right back and centre back.  He made his debut on the 22nd of August, starting in the 1–0 win vs Al-Faisaly. Saad scored his first goal on 28 November 2015 in a 1–1 draw vs Hajer Club. He also successfully converted a penalty in April for the 2–0 win Vs Al-Shabab. He then scored in the following match day vs Najran in the 4–2 win, scoring in back to back matches for the first time in his career, he repeated that feat later in the season when he scored against Al-Fateh and Al-Khaleej. Saad ended the campaign with 5 goals, his best ever tally in a single season. Saad was widely considered as one of the best defensive midfielders in the league by Saudi fans and his efforts in keeping his club in the top flight was rewarded with a contract extension.
2016/2017
In his second season, Saad Returned after the Olympic games to Al-Qadisiyah and participated in Match day two against Al-Faisaly in the right midfield position and provided an assist. He continued to be a starter in the team until match day Seven match against Al-Taawon as he was suspended due to a red card in the matchday six game against Al-Batin. Saad returned as a starter to the squad on matchday nine and remained in the squad until the end of the first term where he alternated between playing in the defensive midfielder position and the right midfield position. Saad scored on back to back matches, firstly in the 5–2 victory over Al Wahda, where he also provided an assist. Followed by a goal vs Al Shabab in a 1–1 draw. in winter 2017 moved to Al-Ahli.

Al-Ahli 
Saad made the switch on January 15, 2017 to Al-Ahli replace Luíz Carlos in a transfer fee of a million euro to the club. contract that will run until 2018.

He made his debut on January 20 of 2017 in the Saudi King Cup against Al-Shoulla as a second-half substitute. Abdulemir made his first start and league debut against Al-Shabab on January 27. He scored his first goal for Al Ahli in the round of 16 cup match against his old club Al-Qadsiah on February 13. He was sent off on the Feb 17 league match vs Al-Nassr. Al Ahli failed to win the title as they lost out to rivals Al Hilal. They also lost the King's cup in the final to the same opposition. However they reached the Quarter final of the Asian Champions League, to end the season on a high. The player was released in August 2017, to make way for other new signings.

Al-Shabab  
Saad Abdul-Emir signed for Al-Shabab on a free transfer on August 9. The club signed him on a one-season contract. He made his debut against former club Al-Qadsiah FC on August 19.

Statistics 
As of 29 May 2017

Style of play
Saad is a Defensive and centre midfielder. He excels in positioning and close range ball control. Saad has also been praised for his leadership qualities.

International career 
In 2010 he was included in German Wolfgang Sidka’s first squad and was one of only three players from an initial 26 players that was selected for the final 2010 WAFF Championship squad, and made his debut in a 3-2 friendly win over Oman national football team, prior to the tournament, which Iraq won the match 3–2. With the likes of Qusay Munir, Salih Sadir and Nashat Akram blocking his way, Saad had to play understudy to the 2007 Asian Cup winners for most of his time with the national side.

Saad scored his first goal for the national team in 2013 in a 1-1 draw with Yemen. Saad was in the Squad for the 2011 AFC Asian Cup in Qatar, as well as the 2015 AFC Asian Cup in Australia.

Rio 2016
Abdul-Amir was selected as one of the 3 over 23 players in Football at the 2016 Summer Olympics – Men's tournament. He was the captain in all three games and scored Iraq's Only Goal in the final group game against South Africa. Iraq Crashed out of the tournament finishing third in the group with 3 draws.

International goals

Iraq U-23

National team
Scores and results list Iraq's goal tally first.

Honours

Club
Erbil SC
 Iraqi Premier League: 2011–12
 AFC Cup runners-up: 2012, 2014
Al-Shorta
 Iraqi Premier League: 2018–19
 Iraqi Super Cup: 2019
Al-Zawraa
 Iraqi Super Cup: 2021

International
Iraq
 WAFF Championship runner-up: 2012
 AFC Asian Cup fourth-place: 2015

Individual
 Soccer Iraq Team of the Decade: 2010–2019
 Soccer Iraq Goal of the Season: 2019–20

References

External links
  Saad Abdulameer vs Brazil Olympics 2016
 
 
 
 

1992 births
Living people
Sportspeople from Baghdad
Iraqi footballers
Association football midfielders
Al-Karkh SC players
Erbil SC players
Al-Qadsiah FC players
Al-Ahli Saudi FC players
Al-Shabab FC (Riyadh) players
Al-Shorta SC players
Iraqi Premier League players
Saudi Professional League players
Olympic footballers of Iraq
Iraq international footballers
2011 AFC Asian Cup players
Footballers at the 2014 Asian Games
2015 AFC Asian Cup players
Footballers at the 2016 Summer Olympics
Asian Games bronze medalists for Iraq
Asian Games medalists in football
Medalists at the 2014 Asian Games
Iraqi expatriate footballers
Iraqi expatriate sportspeople in Saudi Arabia
Expatriate footballers in Saudi Arabia